The 2019 Oregon State Beavers football team represented Oregon State University during the 2019 NCAA Division I FBS football season. The team played their home games on campus at Reser Stadium in Corvallis, Oregon as a member of the North Division of the Pac-12 Conference. They were led by second-year head coach Jonathan Smith. They finished the season 5–7, 4–5 in Pac-12 play to finish in a three-way tie for second place in the North Division.

Preseason

Pac-12 media day

Pac-12 media poll
In the Pac-12 preseason media poll, Oregon State was voted to finish in last place in the North Division.

Schedule

Game summaries

Oklahoma State

at Hawaii

Cal Poly

Stanford

at UCLA

Utah

at California

at Arizona

Washington

Arizona State

at Washington State

at Oregon

Players drafted into the NFL

References

Oregon State
Oregon State Beavers football seasons
Oregon State Beavers football